Sirthenea is a genus of corsairs in the family Reduviidae. There are at least 40 described species in Sirthenea.

Species
These 40 species belong to the genus Sirthenea:

 Sirthenea africana Distant, 1903
 Sirthenea amazona Stål, 1866
 Sirthenea anduzei Drake & Harris
 Sirthenea angolana Villiers, 1958
 Sirthenea atra Willemse, 1985
 Sirthenea atrocyanea Horváth, 1909
 Sirthenea bequaerti Schouteden, 1913
 Sirthenea bharati Sucheta & Chopra, 1988-01
 Sirthenea carinata (Fabricius, 1798)
 Sirthenea clavata Miller, 1948
 Sirthenea collarti Schouteden, 1931
 Sirthenea dimidiata Horváth, 1911
 Sirthenea dubia Willemse, 1985
 Sirthenea erythromelas (Walker, 1873)
 Sirthenea ferdinandi Willemse, 1985
 Sirthenea flaviceps (Signoret, 1860)
 Sirthenea fulvipennis (Walker, 1873)
 Sirthenea glabra (Walker, 1873)
 Sirthenea jamaicensis Willemse, 1985
 Sirthenea koreana Lee & Kerzhner, 1996-01
 Sirthenea laevicollis Horváth, 1909
 Sirthenea leonina Horváth, 1909
 Sirthenea leontovitchi Schouteden, 1931
 Sirthenea melanota Cai & Lu, 1990-01
 Sirthenea nigra Cai & Tomokuni, 2004-01
 Sirthenea nigripes Murugan & Livingstone, 1990-01
 Sirthenea nigronitens (Miller, 1958)
 Sirthenea obscura Stål, 1866
 Sirthenea ocularis Horváth, 1909
 Sirthenea pedestris Horváth, 1909
 Sirthenea peruviana Drake & Harris, 1945
 Sirthenea picescens Reuter, 1887
 Sirthenea plagiata Horváth, 1909
 Sirthenea rapax Horváth, 1909
 Sirthenea rodhaini Schouteden, 1913
 Sirthenea sobria (Walker, 1873)
 Sirthenea stria (Fabricius, 1794)
 Sirthenea venezolana Maldonado, 1955
 Sirthenea vidua Horváth, 1909
 Sirthenea vittata Distant, 1902

References

Further reading

External links

 

Reduviidae
Articles created by Qbugbot